The attorney general of Arkansas, usually known simply as the attorney general (AG), is one of Arkansas's seven constitutional officers. The officeholder serves as the state's top law enforcement officer and consumer advocate.

History
The Attorney General was not originally a state constitutional officer but rather was created by Act 1 of 1843, which designated the Arkansas Attorney for the Fifth Judicial District as the attorney general. The first Attorney General of Arkansas was Robert W. Johnson. The Arkansas Constitution of 1868 made the post elective, though it required only that the attorney general “perform such duties as are now, or may hereafter, be prescribed by law.” This was reaffirmed in the constitution of 1874. Act 131 of 1911 laid out four general responsibilities of the attorney general's office: 1) to give opinions to state officers and agencies “upon any constitutional or other legal question that may concern the official action of said officers”; 2) to defend the interest of the state in federal court and representing all state officers, boards, and commissions in litigation involving the interests of the state; 3) to furnish any board or commission an opinion as to the validity of the title on any land they seek to purchase; and 4) to make a biennial report to the governor and the Arkansas General Assembly on all transactions of the attorney general's office.

Role and duties
The Attorney General represents state agencies and commissions in courts of law, giving opinions on issues presented by legislators and prosecutors, handling criminal matters and habeas corpus matters in the state, and advocating for citizens on issues pertaining to the environment, antitrust, and consumer protection.

List of attorneys general

19th century
 Robert W. Johnson (1843) Democrat
 Geo. C. Watkins (1843–1851) Whig, then Democrat
 J. J. Clendenin (1851–1856) Democrat
 Thomas Johnson (1856–1858) Democrat
 J. L. Hollowell (1858–1861) Democrat
 P. Jordan (1861–1862) Confederate
 Sam W. Williams (1862–1864) Confederate
 Charles T. Jordan (1864–1865) Republican
 R.S. Gantt (1865–1866) Republican
 R. H. Deadman (1866–1868) Republican
 J. R. Montgomery (1868–1873) Republican
 Thomas D. W. Yonley (1873–1874) Republican
 J. L. Witherspoon (1874) Democrat
 Simon P. Hughes (1874–1876) Democrat 
 W. F. Henderson (1877–1881) Democrat
 C. B. Moore (1881–1885) Democrat
 D. W. Jones (1885–1889) Democrat
 W. E. Atkinson (1889–1893) Democrat
 J. P. Clarke (1893–1895) Democrat
 E. B. Kinsworthy (1895–1899) Democrat 
 Jeff Davis (1899–1901) Democrat

20th century
 George W. Murphy (1901–1905) Democrat
 Robt. L. Rogers (1905–1907) Democrat
 Wm. F. Kirby (1907–1909) Democrat
 Hal L. Norwood (1909–1913) Democrat
 William L. Moose (1913–1915) Democrat
 Wallace Davis (1915–1917) Democrat
 John D. Arbuckle (1917–1921) Democrat
 J. S. Utley (1921–1925) Democrat
 W. H. Applegate (1925–1929) Democrat
 Hal L. Norwood (1929–1934) Democrat
 Walter L. Pope (1934–1935) Democrat
 Carl E. Bailey (1935–1937) Democrat
 Jack Holt, Sr. (1937–1943) Democrat
 Guy E. Williams (1943–1949) Democrat
 Ike Murry (1949–1953) Democrat
 Tom Gentry (1953–1957) Democrat
 Bruce Bennett (1957–1961) Democrat
 J. Frank Holt (1961-1962) Democrat
 Jack Holt, Jr. (1962–1963) Democrat
 Bruce Bennett (1963–1967) Democrat
 Joe Purcell (1967–1971) Democrat
 Ray Thornton (1971–1973) Democrat
 Rodney Parham (1973) Democrat
 Jim Guy Tucker (1973–1977) Democrat
 Bill Wilson (1977) Democrat
 Bill Clinton (1977–1979) Democrat
 Steve Clark (1979–1990) Democrat
 Ron Fields (1990) Democrat
 Mary Stallcup (1990-1991) Democrat
 Winston Bryant (1991–1999) Democrat
 Mark Pryor (1999–2003) Democrat

21st century
 Leon Johnson (2003) Democrat
 Mike Beebe (2003–2006) Democrat 
 Dustin McDaniel (2007–2015) Democrat 
 Leslie Rutledge (2015–2023) Republican
 Tim Griffin (2023–present) Republican

See also
Attorney General of the United States

References

External links

Official
 
 General information
 
 Attorneys General of Arkansas at The Political Graveyard
 

 
Attorney General
Attorney General
Attorney General